Dowrahan or Dorahan or Do Rahan may refer to:
 Dowrahan, Chaharmahal and Bakhtiari
 Do Rahan, Isfahan
 Dowrahan Rural District, in Chaharmahal and Bakhtiari Province